Stefán Haukur Jóhannesson (born 4 January 1959 in the Westman Islands, Iceland) is an Icelandic diplomat. He has been the Ambassador of Iceland to Japan since April 2021. He was previously the Ambassador to the United Kingdom from November 2017 to November 2020.

Career 
Jóhannesson has been a civil servant since 1985. From 2001 to 2005, he was the Ambassador of Iceland to the UN in Geneva, and concurrently from 2002 to 2005, the Ambassador of Iceland to Slovenia. From 2005 to 2010, Jóhannesson was the Ambassador to the Netherlands, Luxembourg, Morocco, Switzerland and the EU.

Between 2009 and 2013, Jóhannesson was the Chief Negotiator in Iceland's accession talks with the European Union. The talks were later abandoned.

Jóhannesson was made the Ambassador to the United Kingdom in November 2017. He presented his Letters of Credence to Queen Elizabeth II on 14 December 2017. In November 2020, he was replaced by Sturla Sigurjónsson.

Jóhannesson was already in August 2020 appointed the Ambassador to Japan and originally would take the post at the turn of the year between 2020 and 2021.
He presented his letter of credence to Emperor Naruhito on 8 April 2021.

Personal life 
Jóhannesson is married to Halldóra Hermannsdóttir and they have three children, including Einar Stefánsson, musician from Vök and Hatari. He has a law degree from the University of Iceland.

See also 

 Iceland–United Kingdom relations
 Ambassadors of Iceland

References

External links 
 

Living people
1959 births
Icelandic diplomats
Ambassadors of Iceland to the United Kingdom
Ambassadors of Iceland to the European Union
Ambassadors of Iceland to the Netherlands
Ambassadors of Iceland to Belgium
Ambassadors of Iceland to Luxembourg
Ambassadors of Iceland to Switzerland
Ambassadors of Iceland to Japan
Permanent Representatives of Iceland to the United Nations
University of Iceland alumni